The 2016–17 season is the 89th season in Real Valladolid ’s history.

Squad
.

Competitions

Overall

Liga

League table

Copa del Rey

References

Real Valladolid seasons
Real Valladolid